Rosefield is a historic plantation house located at Windsor, Bertie County, North Carolina. It was built in three sections, with the oldest built about 1786–1791. It is a two-story, five bay, "L"-plan frame dwelling with Georgian, Federal, and Greek Revival style design elements.  It has a two-story, two-bay addition and a two-story rear addition built in 1855. It features a hip roof front porch. Also on the property are the contributing small frame outbuilding, office, dairy, and family cemetery.

The house was named for the fact a bed of wild roses grew at the original site.

It was added to the National Register of Historic Places in 1982.

References

Plantation houses in North Carolina
Houses on the National Register of Historic Places in North Carolina
Georgian architecture in North Carolina
Federal architecture in North Carolina
Greek Revival houses in North Carolina
Houses completed in 1791
Houses in Bertie County, North Carolina
National Register of Historic Places in Bertie County, North Carolina